William Lorenzo Patterson (August 27, 1891 – March 5, 1980) was an African-American leader in the Communist Party USA and head of the International Labor Defense, a group that offered legal representation to communists, trade unionists, and African Americans in cases involving issues of political or racial persecution.

Early life
William Lorenzo Patterson was born August 27, 1891 in San Francisco, California. His father, James Edward Patterson, originally hailed from the island of St. Vincent, in the British West Indies. His mother, Mary Galt Patterson, had been born a slave in the state of Virginia and was the daughter of the organizer of a volunteer regiment of black soldiers who fought with the Union Army during the American Civil War.

Patterson's father was a Seventh-day Adventist missionary to Tahiti and he spent extensive time there, with the rest of the family moving between the California cities of Oakland and Mill Valley, where William attended public schools.

In 1911, Patterson was the first African-American graduate of Tamalpais High School, in Mill Valley, California. In his yearbook, he stated an ambition "to be a second Booker T. Washington." After his graduation, Patterson supported himself working as a laborer in railroad dining cars and on boats that worked the Pacific coast. He saved up enough money to enter the University of California, Berkeley but was expelled during the years of World War I for his refusal to participate in compulsory military training.

Deciding to set his sights on becoming a lawyer, Patterson entered the Hastings College of Law from which he graduated in 1919. He failed the California State Bar Examination, however, and decided to pursue emigration to Liberia and took a job as a cook on a mail ship to England as a means to that end. Patterson found his inquiries about Liberian emigration put off in England because of his lack of construction or practical craft skills. Determined to return to the United States, he landed in New York and gained employment as a longshoreman.
 
Patterson was able to put his college degree to use by finding employment as a clerk in a law office, helping to write briefs, and studying to take the New York State Bar Examination, which he passed in 1924. Meanwhile, he married his first wife, the former Minnie Summer, and made numerous personal acquaintances associated with the booming Harlem Renaissance.

Political activism
Among Patterson's New York friends was the radical political activist Richard B. Moore, who persuaded Patterson to put his legal skills to work in the effort to prevent the execution of the Italian immigrant anarchists Sacco and Vanzetti, who were convicted of murder in a controversial and highly-politicized Massachusetts trial.

Patterson joined the Workers (Communist) Party and became head of the International Labor Defense, a communist legal advocacy organization.

On August 22, 1927, he was among the 156 persons arrested for protesting the execution of immigrants Nicola Sacco and Bartolomeo Vanzetti, both of whom were anarchists.

Patterson was active in the Civil Rights Congress, which succeeded the ILD. In 1951 he presented the document We Charge Genocide to the United Nations that charged the US federal government with complicity in genocide for failing to pass legislation or prosecute persons responsible for lynching, most of whose victims were black men. After he returned from delivering the document in Paris, the United States Department of State revoked his passport and barred him from further travel abroad.

He married Louise Thompson on September 3, 1940. A writer, she had a long association with the poet Langston Hughes, and they collaborated on a proposal for a documentary about Harlem culture.

Death and legacy
At the age of 88, Patterson died in 1980 at Union Hospital, in the Bronx, following a prolonged illness.

Patterson's papers, introduced by a five and a half page biography, are housed at Howard University.

Bibliography
 The Communist Position on the Negro Question. Contributor. New York: New Century Publishers, 1947.
 We Demand Freedom. New York: Civil Rights Congress, 1951.
 A People's Alternative to Mayor Wagner's Tax Program. New York: 1963.
 Negro Liberation: A Goal for All Americans. New York: New Currents Publishers, 1964.
 Ben Davis: Crusader for Negro Freedom and Socialism. New York: New Outlook Publishers, 1967.
 In Honor of Paul Robeson: Excerpts of a Speech by William L. Patterson. New York: Communist Party USA, n.d. [1969].
 Some Aspects of the Black Liberation Struggle: Two Lectures. With Claude Lightfoot. New York: Black Liberation Commission, CPUSA, n.d. [1969].
 We Charge Genocide: The Historic Petition to the United Nations for Relief from a Crime of the United States Government against the Negro People. Editor. New York: International Publishers, 1970.
 Four Score Years in Freedom's Fight: A Tribute to William L. Patterson on the Occasion of his 80th Birthday, Chicago, Illinois, October 22, 1971. Contributor, with Claude Lightfoot. New York: New Outlook Publishers, 1972.
 The Man Who Cried Genocide: An Autobiography. New York: International Publishers, 1971.

References

Further reading
 Walter T. Howard, We Shall Be Free!: Black Communist Protests in Seven Voices. Philadelphia, PA: Temple University Press, 2013.

External links
 

1891 births
1980 deaths
American communists
Activists for African-American civil rights
African-American lawyers
20th-century American lawyers
Civil Rights Congress
Tamalpais High School alumni
Members of the Communist Party USA
African-American communists